Lerema accius, the clouded skipper, is a butterfly of the family Hesperiidae. It is found in the United States from Georgia west to Texas, south to Florida, and south through Mexico and Central America to Venezuela and Colombia.

The wingspan is 32–45 mm. Adults are on wing year round in Florida and southern Texas.

The larvae feed on various grasses including Saccharum giganteum, Stenotaphrum secundatum, Erianthus alopecturoides and Echinochloa povietianum. Adults feed on the nectar of various pink, purple, or white flowers, including shepherd's needle, selfheal, vervain, buttonbush and lantana.

Subspecies
Lerema accius accius
Lerema accius lochius (Venezuela)

Photos

References

External links
Butterflies and Moths of North America

Hesperiinae
Hesperiidae of South America
Lepidoptera of Colombia
Butterflies described in 1797
Butterflies of Central America
Butterflies of North America